Serio Oriento-Okcidento is a publication series initiated by the Universal Esperanto Association, which aims to contribute to the "Program of UNESCO for the study and mutual appreciation of cultures." In the series, particularly important and representative works of world literature are translated into Esperanto. Various publishers have gradually contributed to the Serio, who have published books according to their ability and financial responsibility. The Steering Committee (Estraro) of the UEA approves the work for the Serio according to publisher's proposals, but the UEA has no financial responsibility.

Technical requirements 

 Magnitude: Normally all works of Serio have at least a hundred printed pages.
 Language: The language quality of the translation must be guaranteed.
 Introduction: Each volume must contain a brief explanation on the objectives of the Serio. This explanation may also appear as a longer preface by the President of the UEA or another person appointed for that purpose by the Committee.
 Technical details: The format, layout, font should resemble as closely as possible to those volumes already published in the Serio, size 21 x 15 cm, printed area 162 x 100 mm, of 9- or 10-point font.
 On the cover pages should appear the words "Serio Oriento Okcidento-n-ro # Sub Aŭspicio de UEA in Operaciaj Rilatoj kun Unesko." (Series East-West, No # Under the auspices of the UEA in consultative relations with UNESCO). The Director General of UEA indicate the serial number.
 Number to publish: The number to publish must be decided in agreement with the Managing Director of UEA.
 Part of the publication will be bound (or securely stapled).
 The publisher will send to the Central Office since the publication of UEA five bound copies for Hodler Library and for purposes of representation (including: UNESCO Library).

Items of the Serio

References

External links 
 ELDONSERIO “ORIENTO-OKCIDENTO” SUB AŬSPICIO DE UEA 

Esperanto literature
UNESCO
Book series introduced in 1961